In navigation, a radio beacon or radiobeacon is a kind of beacon, a device that marks a fixed location and allows direction-finding equipment to find relative bearing. But instead of employing visible light, radio beacons transmit electromagnetic radiation in the radio wave band. They are used for direction-finding systems on ships, aircraft and vehicles.

Radio beacons transmit a continuous or periodic radio signal with limited information (for example, its identification or location) on a specified radio frequency. Occasionally, the beacon's transmission includes other information, such as telemetric or meteorological data.

Radio beacons have many applications, including air and sea navigation, propagation research, robotic mapping, radio-frequency identification (RFID), near-field communication (NFC) and indoor navigation, as with real-time locating systems (RTLS) like Syledis or simultaneous localization and mapping (SLAM).

Types

Radio-navigation beacons
 
The most basic radio-navigational aid used in aviation is the non-directional beacon or NDB. It is a simple low- and medium-frequency transmitter used to locate airway intersections and airports and to conduct instrument approaches, with the use of a radio direction finder located on the aircraft. The aviation NDBs, especially the ones marking airway intersections, are gradually being decommissioned and replaced with other navigational aids based on newer technologies. Due to relatively low purchase, maintenance and calibration cost, NDBs are still used to mark locations of smaller aerodromes and important helicopter landing sites.

Marine beacons, based on the same technology and installed in coastal areas, have also been used by ships at sea. Most of them, especially in the Western world, are no longer in service, while some have been converted to telemetry transmitters for differential GPS.

Other than dedicated radio beacons, any AM, VHF, or UHF radio station at a known location can be used as a beacon with direction-finding equipment.

ILS marker beacons

A marker beacon is a specialized beacon used in aviation, in conjunction with an instrument landing system (ILS), to give pilots a means to determine distance to the runway. Marker beacons transmit on the dedicated frequency of 75 MHz. This type of beacon is slowly being phased out, and most new ILS installations have no marker beacons.

Amateur radio propagation beacons

An amateur radio propagation beacon is specifically used to study the propagation of radio signals. Nearly all of them are part of the amateur radio service.

Single-letter high-frequency beacons

A group of radio beacons with single-letter identifiers ("C", "D", "M", "S", "P", etc.) transmitting in Morse code have been regularly reported on various high frequencies. There is no official information available about these transmitters, and they are not registered with the International Telecommunication Union. Some investigators suggest that some of these so-called "cluster beacons" are actually radio propagation beacons for naval use.

Space and satellite radio beacons

Beacons are also used in both geostationary and inclined-orbit satellites. Any satellite will emit one or more beacons (normally on a fixed frequency) whose purpose is twofold; as well as containing modulated station-keeping information (telemetry), the beacon locates the satellite (determines its azimuth and elevation) in the sky.

A beacon was left on the moon by the last Apollo mission, transmitting FSK telemetry on 2276.0 MHz

Driftnet buoy radio beacons

Driftnet radio buoys are extensively used by fishing boats operating in open seas and oceans. They are useful for collecting long fishing lines or fishing nets, with the assistance of a radio direction finder. According to product information released by manufacturer Kato Electronics Co, Ltd., these buoys transmit on 1600–2850 kHz with a power of 4-15 W.

Some types of driftnet buoys, called "SelCall buoys", answer only when they are called by their own ships. Using this technique the buoy prevents nets and fishing gears from being carried away by other ships, while the battery power consumption remains low.

Distress radio beacons

Distress radio beacons, also collectively known as distress beacons, emergency beacons, or simply beacons, are those tracking transmitters that operate as part of the international Cospas-Sarsat Search and Rescue satellite system. When activated, these beacons send out a distress signal that, when detected by non-geostationary satellites, can be located by triangulation. In the case of 406 MHz beacons, which transmit digital signals, the beacons can be uniquely identified almost instantly (via GEOSAR), and a GPS position can be encoded into the signal (thus providing both instantaneous identification and position). Distress signals from the beacons are homed by search and rescue (SAR) aircraft and ground search parties, who can in turn come to the aid of the concerned boat, aircraft or persons.

There are three kinds of distress radio beacons:
 EPIRBs (emergency position-indicating radio beacons) signal maritime distress
 ELTs (emergency locator transmitters) signal aircraft distress
 PLBs (personal locator beacons) are for personal use and are intended to indicate a person in distress who is away from normal emergency response capabilities (i.e. 911)

The basic purpose of distress radio beacons is to rescue people within the so-called "golden day"  (the first 24 hours following a traumatic event), when the majority of survivors can still be saved.

Wi-Fi beacons

In the field of Wi-Fi (wireless local area networks using the IEEE 802.11b and 802.11g specification), the term beacon signifies a specific data transmission from the wireless access point (AP), which carries the SSID, the channel number and security protocols such as Wired Equivalent Privacy (WEP) or Wi-Fi Protected Access (WPA). This transmission does not contain the link layer address of another Wi-Fi device, therefore it can be received by any LAN client.

AX.25 packet radio beacons
Stations participating in packet radio networks based on the AX.25 link layer protocol also use beacon transmissions to identify themselves and broadcast brief information about operational status. The beacon transmissions use special UI or Unnumbered Information frames, which are not part of a connection and can be displayed by any station. Beacons in traditional AX.25 amateur packet radio networks contain free format information text, readable by human operators.

This mode of AX.25 operation, using a formal machine-readable beacon text specification developed by Bob Bruninga, WB4APR, became the basis of the APRS networks.

See also

 iBeacon
 Non-directional beacon
 Marker beacon
 Letter beacon
 Radio direction finder
 Direction finding
 Bluetooth and Wi-Fi
 Mobile phone tracking
 Robotic mapping
 Rebecca/Eureka transponding radar

References

Further reading

 An Accurate and Cheap Navigation System for Robots , using sonar beacons.
 Minimum-resource distributed navigation and mapping , using IR beacon.

 
 
 
 
 Five steps to creating a Wireless Network 

Navigation
Radio frequency propagation
Beacons